With the development of the printing press in the 19th century, the Arabic short story (Arabic القصة القصيرة) first appeared in 1870 in daily newspapers and weekly magazines, perhaps because it is compact enough to be published and can be read without much expense .
By the end of the 19th century, Egyptian, Lebanese and Syrian newspapers and magazines increased the publication of short stories  and sections of original or translated novels,  influenced by the Western world and the view of the human struggle in the world that was illustrated in literary works such as that of  Franz Kafka. During that time, Arab writers referred to this type of creative writing as Riwaya, Qissah, or Hikayah to denote more specific types of what is known and accepted today as the short story. Egyptian authors such as Muhammad Husayn Haykal, Mahmoud Taymour, Tawfiq al-Hakim, Yusuf Idris and others influenced the first modern Syrian Arabic short story. Today, many Syrian authors such as Zakaria Tamer, Faris Farzur, Ghada al-Samman, and many others are considered to be some of the most distinguished authors who contributed much to the development of this genre.

The Arabic short story can be classified in three different periods.  The first is “The Embryonic Stage,” (Arabic المرحلة الجنينيّة)  dated from the beginning of the 19th century to 1914; the works of writers of this stage such as Salim Al-Bustani, Labibah Hashim, Khalil Gibran, Mustafa Lutfi al-Manfaluti and others were described as melancholic, and they had adapted Western short story techniques. The second stage, known as “The Trial Stage,” (Arabic المرحلة التجريبيّة)dated from 1914 to 1925, may be called the traditional stage, in which we find clear attempts for authentic voices. Writers of this new genre, such Muhammad Taymour, Tahir Lashin and others, felt it necessary of studying its techniques in Western literature and approach it in a more unconventional way. And finally, “The Formative Stage,” (Arabic  المرحلة التشكيليّة) which extends from 1925 to the present, was opened by Mahmoud Taymour, where a new narrative style emerged emphasizing the development and psychological analysis of the characters in the stories with a more realistic approach.
In the 1960s, the short story achieved a distinguished level of grounding in specific artistic characteristics, including an insistence on  being short in length, encompassing a short time frame, having critical and deep details, written in prose language, having a minimal number of characters, and conveying an ambiguous ending which leaves the reader to his own imagination and interpretation.

See also
 Arabic literature

References
Akif, M. "Political Criticism in the Short Stories of Yusuf Idris: "Innocence" and "19502"." Massachusetts Review. 42:4 :672-688, 2001.
Kahf, M. "The Silences of Contemporary Syrian Literature." World Literature Today. Norman: Spring. Vol.75, Iss.; pg. 24-237, 2001.
Samādī, Imtinān.  Zakarīyā Tāmir wa-al-qissah al-qasīrah. ‘Ammān: al-Mu’assasah al-‘Arabīyah, 1995.
Mostafa Sokkar , "Maayoof al makhtoof" published in iraqstory.net. Jan,2003.

Arabic language